This is a list of films which have been placed number-one at the South Korean box office during 2008, based on admissions.

Highest-grossing films

References

See also 
 List of South Korean films of 2008

2008 in South Korean cinema
2008
South Korea